Gerrit Nauber (born 13 April 1992) is a German professional footballer who plays as a defender for Go Ahead Eagles.

Career
Nauber moved to MSV Duisburg for the 2017–18 season. He left Duisburg after the 2018–19 season.

On 10 July 2019, he signed for SV Sandhausen.

References

External links

1992 births
Living people
People from Georgsmarienhütte
German footballers
Germany youth international footballers
Association football defenders
Bayer 04 Leverkusen II players
Sportfreunde Lotte players
MSV Duisburg players
SV Sandhausen players
Go Ahead Eagles players
2. Bundesliga players
3. Liga players
Regionalliga players
Footballers from Lower Saxony